Al Klawitter (born Albert Hermann Klawitter) (March 29, 1889 - May 2, 1950) was a Major League Baseball pitcher. Klawitter played two seasons with the New York Giants before playing his final season with the Detroit Tigers.

References

Sportspeople from Wilkes-Barre, Pennsylvania
New York Giants (NL) players
Detroit Tigers players
Major League Baseball pitchers
1889 births
1950 deaths
Vicksburg Hill Climbers players
Shreveport Pirates (baseball) players
Memphis Turtles players
New Orleans Pelicans (baseball) players
Portland Beavers players
Sacramento Sacts players
Sacramento Wolves players
Mission Wolves players
Oakland Oaks (baseball) players
Salt Lake City Bees players
Baseball players from Pennsylvania